Saint-Ouen-le-Brisoult is a commune in the Orne department in north-western France.

The inhabitants are known as Audoniens and Audoniennes.

Demographics
The population has varied over the past 50 years:

See also
Communes of the Orne department
Parc naturel régional Normandie-Maine

References

Saintouenlebrisoult